The year 1979 was the 8th year after the independence of Bangladesh. It was also the third year of the Government of Ziaur Rahman. This year martial law is lifted following elections, which Zia's Bangladesh National Party (BNP) wins.

Incumbents

 President: Ziaur Rahman
 Prime Minister: Mashiur Rahman (until 12 March), Shah Azizur Rahman (starting 15 April)
 Chief Justice: Kemaluddin Hossain

Demography

Climate

Economy

Note: For the year 1979 average official exchange rate for BDT was 15.55 per US$.

Events

 26 January – Near Chuadanga, a train derails and overturns, killing at least 70 and injuring at least 300.
 18 February – Second National Parliamentary Elections were held. The result was a victory for the Bangladesh Nationalist Party, which won 207 of the 300 seats.
 6 April – The Fifth Amendment to the Constitution of Bangladesh was passed by the Jatiya Sangsad. This Act amended the Fourth Schedule to the constitution by adding a new paragraph 18 thereto, which provided that all amendments, additions, modifications, substitutions and omissions made in the constitution during the period between 15 August 1975 and 9 April 1979 (both days inclusive) by any Proclamation or Proclamation Order of the Martial Law Authorities had been validly made and would not be called in question in or before any court or tribunal or authority on any ground whatsoever.
 7 April – Bangladesh started the Expanded Program on Immunization (EPI) to reduce child deaths from vaccine preventable diseases.

Awards and Recognitions

Independence Day Award

Ekushey Padak
 Azizur Rahman (literature)
 Benajir Ahmed (literature)
 Abdul Latif (music)
 Sheikh Luthfur Rahman (music)
 Abdul Wahab (journalism)
 Mohammad Modabber (journalism)
 Muhammad Enamul Haque (education)

Sports
 Domestic football: Team BJMC won Dhaka League title, while Abahani KC came out runners-up.

Births
 Kazi Sharmin Nahid Nupur also known by stage name Shabnur, film actress
 Sadika Parvin Popy, film actress
 Anila Naz Chowdhury, singer

Deaths
 3 April – Syed Mahbub Murshed, lawyer and jurist (b. 1911)
 27 June – Bande Ali Mia, poet (b. 1906)

See also 
 1970s in Bangladesh
 List of Bangladeshi films of 1979
 Timeline of Bangladeshi history

References